Telling Secrets (a.k.a. Contract for Murder) is a 1993 American television film directed by Marvin J. Chomsky and starring Cybill Shepherd.
It is based on the true story of Joy Aylor, who plots the murder of her adulterous husband's mistress.

Cast
 Cybill Shepherd as Faith Kelsey
 Ken Olin as Detective Jay Jensen
 James McCaffrey as Jack Merrick
 Christopher McDonald as Terry Kelsey
 Gary Grubbs as Detective Ron Taylor
 Andrew Robinson as Dr. Phillip Eckhart
 G.D. Spradlin as Walter Jefferson
 Dylan Walsh as Jesse Graham
 Melora Walters as Karen Blake
 Mary Kay Place as Shelley Jefferson Carp
 Anne Haney as Grace Jefferson
 Lynn Milgrim as Gloria Marsh
 Ann Risley as Sally DeVries

Reception
David Hiltbrand of People graded the film a B.

References

External links
 

1993 films
1993 television films
ABC Movie of the Week
Films directed by Marvin J. Chomsky
1990s English-language films